A list of the most notable films produced in Bulgaria ordered by year and decade of release. For an alphabetical list of articles on Bulgarian films see :Category:Bulgarian films.

1910-1949
List of Bulgarian films: 1919-1949

1950s
List of Bulgarian films of the 1950s

1960s
List of Bulgarian films of the 1960s

1970s
List of Bulgarian films of the 1970s

1980s
List of Bulgarian films of the 1980s

1990s
List of Bulgarian films: 1990s

2000s
List of Bulgarian films: 2000s

2010s
List of Bulgarian films: 2010s

2020s
List of Bulgarian films: 2020s

References
 The Internet movie database

External links
 Bulgarian film search at the Internet Movie Database
 Bulgarian movies on Neterra.TV